Impatiens pallida, with the common names pale jewelweed, pale touch-me-not, or yellow jewelweed, is a flowering annual plant in the family Balsaminaceae native to Canada and the United States. It grows in moist to wet soils, generally alongside the closely related Impatiens capensis, producing flowers from midsummer through fall.

Description 

The light green stems branch frequently and are smooth and slightly succulent. They are simple, hairless, ovate, and have teeth on the margins. 

The flowers are yellow, with reddish-spots on their faces, differentiating the plant from the similar Impatiens capensis, which has orange flowers. The flowers cluster in small quantities among the upper leaves. When the seeds are ripe, they explode from the pod when touched, giving the plant its common name, touch-me-not.

Pollination
Nectar spurs are tubular elongations of petals and sepals of certain flowers that usually contain nectar. Flowers of Impatiens pallida have nectar spurs which are thought to have played a role in plant-pollinator coevolution. Most of the nectar spurs of Impatiens pallida are perpendicular but some of them are curved.

These nectar spur flowers are either partially or completely pollinated by insects. The specific pollinator is determined by the curvature of the nectar spur. Since Impatiens pallida have perpendicular nectar spurs, bees are the main pollinators.

Distribution and habitat
I. pallida is native in the United States from North Dakota to the north and west, Georgia to the south, and Maine to the east. In Canada, it is native in Ontario, Quebec, New Brunswick, Newfoundland, and Nova Scotia. It can be found in wet, soggy soils, such as along ponds and streams, in swamps,  in moist deciduous woodlands, and in wet thickets.

Uses 
Like Impatiens capensis, the young shoots can be boiled (with two changes of water) as a potherb, and the seeds are also edible.

Along with other species of jewelweed or "touch-me-not", it is a traditional remedy for skin rashes.

References

External links

Connecticut Botanical Society: Impatiens pallida
Plants For A Future: Impatiens pallida 
USDA Plants Database: Impatiens pallida

pallida
Flora of North America
Plants described in 1818
Medicinal plants of North America